The Beijing Treaty may refer to:
 Convention of Peking, three treaties concluded between Qing China and each of Great Britain, France and Russia in 1860.
 Sino-Portuguese Treaty of Peking of 1887 between Qing China and Portugal.
 Convention for the Extension of Hong Kong Territory, also known as the "Second Convention of Peking", a treaty concluded between Qing China and Great Britain in 1898.
 Beijing Convention, a 2010 multilateral aviation treaty
 Beijing Protocol, a 2010 protocol supplement to the 1970 Hague Hijacking Convention
 Beijing Treaty on Audiovisual Performances, a 2012 multilateral copyright treaty